The Cromwellian Club was a 1960s London nightclub at 3 Cromwell Road, South Kensington.

The Cromwellian was started in late 1964 by Tony Mitchell, and managed and part owned by Bob Archer.

Jimi Hendrix played there.

External links
The Cromwellian Club, late 1966, from a Granada TV documentary

References

Nightclubs in London
Music venues in London
South Kensington